Lycosella is a genus of spiders in the family Lycosidae. It was first described in 1890 by Thorell. , it contains 5 species found in Hawaii and Sumatra.

References

Lycosidae
Araneomorphae genera
Spiders of Hawaii
Spiders of Asia